Botswana is a landlocked country located in Southern Africa. A mid-sized country of just over 2 million people, Botswana is one of the most sparsely populated nations in the world. Around 10 percent of the population lives in the capital and largest city, Gaborone. Formerly one of the poorest countries in the world—with a GDP per capita of about US$70 per year in the late 1960s—Botswana has since transformed itself into one of the fastest-growing economies in the world. The economy is dominated by mining, cattle, and tourism. Botswana boasts a GDP (purchasing power parity) per capita of about $18,825 per year , which is one of the highest in Africa. Its high gross national income (by some estimates the fourth-largest in Africa) gives the country a modest standard of living and the highest Human Development Index of continental Sub-Saharan Africa.

Notable firms 
This list includes notable companies with primary headquarters located in the country. The industry and sector follow the Industry Classification Benchmark taxonomy. Organizations which have ceased operations are included and noted as defunct.

See also
 Economy of Botswana
List of companies in Gaborone
List of Botswana-related topics

References 

 
 
Botswana
Botswana companies